Mifflin may refer to:

Places

United States
 Fort Mifflin in Philadelphia, Pennsylvania
 Mifflin, Indiana
 Mifflin, Ohio
 Mifflin, Pennsylvania
 Mifflin County, Pennsylvania
 Mifflin, Tennessee
 Mifflin, West Virginia
 Mifflin, Wisconsin
 Mifflin (community), Wisconsin, an unincorporated community
 Mifflin Township (disambiguation)

Other uses
 Dunder Mifflin, a fictional Northeastern American paper company
 Mifflin (surname)
 Mifflin Street Block Party, a large block party held annually in Madison, Wisconsin
 A (historical) reference to the publishers Houghton Mifflin Harcourt